Shah-e Mashhad is the left overs of a destroyed school known as Ghurid madrasa from the 12th century in the Afghan province of Badghis. It is located on the left bank of the Murgab River. It has been said that the building was donated by an unknown woman. However, the architecture of the school building is Ghuridic referring back to the Ghurid's dynasty.

The building is made of fired bricks forming a rough 44.0 × 44.2 meters square. Until the 1970s only larger parts of the south side of the building were preserved, which they are decorated with architectural ornaments and captions. The remains of an iwan and  two rooms, each covered with a dome were also found in the building.

The north side walls of the building come from an iwan circulating around the inner courtyard. But no excavation was ever done to prove this.

The façade is decorated with a rich terracotta relief with ornamental engravings. A total of 15 inscriptions could be documented, ten of them in Kufic style, three of them in Naskh style, and two of them in Thuluth style.

During the war of  the Soviet Union in Afghanistan the remains of the mid-1980s were completely destroyed.

Literature 

 Michael J. Casimir, Bernt Glazer: Šāh-i Mašhad: A Recently Discovered Madrasah of the Ghurid Region in Ġarǧistan (Afghanistan). In: East and West , March 21-June 1971, pp. 53–68 of the JSTOR article

External links 

 Shah-i Mashhad Madrasa
 Shah-i Mashhad Madrasa auf Archnet

Individual evidence 
* Major CE Yate: Northern Afghanistan. Cambridge Scholars Publishing, Newcastle upon Tyne 2003, p. Xii

References 

12th-century architecture
Geography of Badghis Province
Mosques in Afghanistan
Archaeological sites in Asia
Archaeological sites in Afghanistan